Hayti Township is an inactive township in Pemiscot County, in the U.S. state of Missouri.

Hayti Township takes its name from the community of Hayti, Missouri.

References

Townships in Missouri
Townships in Pemiscot County, Missouri